Willoughby-Eastlake City School District is a public school district located in Lake County, Ohio.  The district serves students from Eastlake, Lakeline, Timberlake, Waite Hill, Willoughby, Willoughby Hills and  Willowick.

Schools

Preschools
 Willoughby-Eastlake Preschool (34050 Glen Dr, Eastlake)

Elementary schools
 Edison Elementary School (5288 Karen Isle Dr, Willoughby)
 Grant Elementary School (2838 Lost Nation Rd, Willoughby)
 Jefferson Elementary School (35980 Lakeshore Blvd, Eastlake)
 Longfellow Elementary School (35200 Stevens Blvd, Eastlake)
 Royalview Elementary School (31500 Royalview Dr, Willowick)
 The School of Innovation, grades 3-8 (32500 Chardon Rd., Willoughby Hills)

Middle schools
 Eastlake Middle School (35972 Lakeshore Blvd, Eastlake)
 Willoughby Middle School (5000 Shankland Rd, Willoughby)
 Willowick Middle School (31500 Royalview Dr, Willowick)
 The School of Innovation, grades 3-8 (32500 Chardon Rd., Willoughby Hills)

High schools
 North High School (34041 Stevens Blvd, Eastlake)
 South High School (4900 Shankland Rd, Willoughby)

Sources

Willoughby-Eastlake District Site

School districts in Ohio
Education in Lake County, Ohio